François Lotte (1889–1970) was a French archetier and bow maker.

Son of Georges Lotte who was a luthier and violin maker in the Vuillaume shop. François Lotte received his training in the best French tradition, initially apprenticed with Bazin. In 1919 he married Marguerite Ouchard, daughter of Émile François Ouchard and sister of Émile Auguste Ouchard. François later went on to work for Eugène Cuniot-Hury (between 1922-1925). By 1926 he set up his own business in Paris.

His bows are often stamped with the stamp of the shop or maker he was working for or not stamped at all. His bows are elegant, precise, excellent in workmanship and combine good playing and sound qualities. He left a large number of bows of  very good quality. Many bows are  mounted in silver as well as maillechort/nickel mounted.

His brands include:
"FRANCOIS LOTTE" in large letters
"Fcois LOTTE" in large letters
"FRANCOIS LOTTE" in small letters

His son Roger François Lotte, born 1922, took over the shop around 1960. François the father continued to make bows until his sudden  death in 1970.

Notes

References 
 
 
 
 Dictionnaire Universel des Luthiers - René Vannes 1951,1972, 1985 (vol.3)

1889 births
1970 deaths
Luthiers from Mirecourt
Bow makers